The Circus is an American television documentary series initially following the 2016 presidential race, the Trump administration, the 2020 United States presidential election, and now the Biden administration. It is produced by Left/Right Productions, a Red Arrow Studios company, for Showtime.

The docu-series premiered on January 17, 2016, and focused on the 2016 U.S. presidential election, January to November. It was renewed for a second season, which premiered on March 19, 2017, and focused on President Trump's first 100 days. It returned on April 15, 2018 for a third season, and focused on the mid-term elections, with CBS News anchor Alex Wagner stepping in as co-host to replace Mark Halperin, who was replaced on January 3, 2018, by the show, after sexual harassment allegations. Jennifer Palmieri joined as guest host beginning October 13, 2019, with season four episode twelve, Desperate Times, Desperate Measures, and joined as a permanent co-host in season 6.

The first half of the fifth season premiered on January 26, 2020. The second half of the fifth season premiered August 16, 2020. The sixth season premiered on January 10, 2021. The seventh season premiered on March 6, 2022. The second half of the seventh season premiered on September 25, 2022. The eighth season premiered on February 26, 2023.

Episodes

Series overview

Season 1: Inside the Greatest Political Show on Earth (2016)

Season 2: Inside the Biggest Story on Earth (2017)

Season 3: Inside the Wildest Political Show on Earth (2018)

Season 4: Inside the Wildest Political Show on Earth (2019)

Season 5: Inside the Craziest Political Campaign on Earth (2020)

Season 6: Inside the Greatest Political Show on Earth (2021)

Season 7: Inside the Greatest Political Show on Earth (2022)

Season 8: Inside the Greatest Political Show on Earth (2023)

Reception
The Circus received generally positive reviews from critics. On the review aggregator Rotten Tomatoes, season 1 has a rating of 75%, based on 12 reviews, with an average rating of 7/10. The consensus reads: "The Circus reveals a more human side of the candidates and paints a clear picture of how grueling life can be on the campaign trail, yet the show fails to provide the type of candid analysis and discourse it alludes to during this incredibly unique and cantankerous election cycle." On Metacritic, the series has a score of 75 out of 100, based on 5 reviews, indicating "Generally favorable reviews".

References

2016 American television series debuts
2016 United States presidential election in popular culture
2010s American documentary television series
2020s American documentary television series
2010s American political television series
2020s American political television series
Media about the Trump presidency
Showtime (TV network) original programming
English-language television shows
Documentary television series about politics